Ramin Raziani (born April 12, 1974) is a professional tennis player, tennis coach and entrepreneur.

Biography
Raziani had been playing tennis for 32 years, and coaching for 20 years. He started playing tennis at the age of four, in his native country Iran. He is certified as coach in Iran, and professional PTR in Canada. Raziani has been ranked number one in Iran for ten years, and is also a former Asian champion. He has won 28 international tournaments and made 16 finals in doubles. This includes the Satellite tournament and Challenger tournament. Ramin on 2010 became  Number 147 ITF  Rank In The World.

He was captain and player for the Iranian National Team from 1991 to 2005, played first league for Italy in 1993 to 1995 and played in the Asian Olympics in 1994 and 1998. He transformed one player to rank 198 ATP and was also able to bring the ranks of two juniors up to 12th and 16th in the ITF.

In addition to being a coach at Mayfair Fitness and Racquet clubs, a premier tennis club in Toronto, Ontario. Ramin has also started a high-end waterless carwash company called Ecomobile Auto Spa.

References

External links
 
 

Living people
1974 births
Iranian male tennis players
Tennis players at the 1994 Asian Games
Tennis players at the 1998 Asian Games
Asian Games competitors for Iran